Anomalopus swansoni, also known commonly as the punctate worm-skink or Swanson's burrowing skink, is a species of lizard in the family Scincidae. The species is endemic to Australia.

Etymology
The specific name, swansoni, is in honor of Australian herpetologist, Stephen Swanson.

Geographic range
A. swansoni is found between the Hawkesbury River and the Hunter River in eastern New South Wales.

Description
A. swansoni is pinkish-brown on top, with fine dark speckles, and a creamy-pink belly.

Habitat
The preferred natural habitats of A. swansoni are supralittoral zone, grassland, shrubland, and forest.

Behaviour
A. swansoni shelters in soil, wood and rocks, and is rarely seen unless disturbed.

Reproduction
A. swansoni is viviparous.

References

Further reading
Cogger HG (2014). Reptiles and Amphibians of Australia, Seventh Edition. Clayton, Victoria, Australia: CSIRO Publishing. xxx + 1,033 pp. .
Greer AE, Cogger HG (1985). "Systematics of the Reduce-limbed and Limbless Skinks Currently Assigned to the Genus Anomalopus (Lacertilia: Scincidae)". Records of the Australian Museum 37 (1): 11–54. (Anomalopus swansoni, new species, pp. 23–24 + Figures 9–12).
Swanson, Stephen (1990). Lizards of Australia. Revised edition. HarperCollins (Australia). 162 pp. .
Wilson, Steve; Swan, Gerry (2013). A Complete Guide to Reptiles of Australia, Fourth Edition. Sydney: New Holland Publishers. 522 pp. .

Anomalopus
Skinks of Australia
Reptiles described in 1985
Taxa named by Allen Eddy Greer
Taxa named by Harold Cogger